Roslan may refer to:

Roslan Ahmad, Malaysian politician, Malacca State Executive Councillor
Wan Roslan Wan Hamat, Malaysian politician, Kelantan State Executive Councillor
Emmett Roslan Ishak, lead vocalist in Butterfingers, a Malaysian rock band
Abdul Afiq Roslan (born 1996), Bruneian footballer
Faizal Roslan, Singaporean professional footballer
Farhan Roslan (born 1996), Malaysian footballer
Fauzi Roslan (born 1988), aka Kojie, Malaysian footballer
Izray Iffarul Roslan (born 1992), Malaysian footballer
Izzuddin Roslan (born 1999), Malaysian professional footballer
Jamaluddin Roslan (born 1978), Malaysian field hockey player
Razman Roslan (born 1984), Malaysian professional footballer
Syazwan Roslan (born 1988), Malaysian footballer
Takhiyuddin Roslan (born 1993), Malaysian footballer
Roslan Sulaiman, Malaysian academic administrator

See also
Rizlan
Rosaleen
Rosalyn (disambiguation)
Roslin (disambiguation)
Roslyn (disambiguation)
Rosslyn (disambiguation)
Rozalin (disambiguation)
Ruslan (disambiguation)